The 2022 Pac-12 Conference women's basketball tournament, presented by New York Life, was a postseason tournament held March 2–6, 2022, at Michelob Ultra Arena on the Las Vegas Strip in Paradise, Nevada. Stanford won their 15th Pac-12 title, receiving a bid to the 2022 NCAA tournament.

Seeds

Schedule

Bracket

Note: * denotes overtime

All-Tournament Team
Source:

Most Outstanding Player

See also
 2022 Pac-12 Conference men's basketball tournament

References

External links
Official website – Pac-12 Conference women's basketball tournament

Tournament
Pac-12 Conference women's basketball tournament
Pac-12
Women's sports in Nevada
2022 in sports in Nevada
20th century in Las Vegas
Basketball competitions in the Las Vegas Valley
College sports tournaments in Nevada